Heger is a German surname, it may refer to:

 Altfrid Heger, German racing driver
 Anders Heger (born 1956), Norwegian publisher and writer
 Astrid Heppenstall Heger Professor of Clinical Pediatrics at the USC Keck School of Medicine in East Los Angeles
 Constantin Heger (1809–1896), Belgian teacher of the Victorian era
 Eduard Heger, Slovak politician, incumbent Prime Minister of Slovakia
 Eline Heger (1774–1842), Danish stage actress
 Leoš Heger, Czech politician
 Mary Lea Heger (born 1897), founder of the Lick Observatory Archives
 Robert Heger (1886–1978), German conductor and composer
 Simpson Gumpertz & Heger Inc., engineering firm that designs, investigates, and rehabilitates structures and building enclosures
 Wanda Hjort Heger (born 1921), Norwegian social worker who helped prisoners in World War II Nazi concentration camps

German-language surnames
Occupational surnames